"Fürstenfeld", named after the town of the same name in Styria is a song recorded in 1984 by Austrian pop rock group S.T.S. It reached the top of the Austrian Charts in 1984.

The song's lyrics are about the singer feeling homesick for his hometown Fürstenfeld, after having commercially failed and not being able to put up with the habits in Austria's capital Vienna.

References 

1984 singles
S.T.S. songs
1984 songs
Fürstenfeld